The Russian Arctic islands are a number of islands groups and sole islands scattered around the Arctic Ocean.

Geography
The islands are all situated within the  Arctic Circle and are scattered through the marginal seas of the Arctic Ocean, namely, the Barents Sea, Kara Sea, Laptev Sea, East Siberian Sea, Chukchi Sea and Bering Sea.

It is Russia's second largest island next to Sakhalin Island, and the fourth largest island in Europe.

History
The Russian Empire officially claimed the Arctic islands to its north in a Note of the Russian Government of 20 September 1916 - this covered the islands of Henrietta, Jeannette, Bennett, Herald, Edinenie, New Siberia, Wrangel, Novaya Zemlya, Kolguev, Vaigach and others. On 15 April 1926, the Soviet Union reaffirmed this claim.

Islands
The area includes from west to east:

 Victoria Island (Остров Виктория; Ostrov Viktoriya), about 
 Franz Josef Land (Земля Франца Иосифа; Zemlya Frantsa-Iosifa), about 
 Zemlya Georga (Земля Георга, Zemlya Georga), about 
 Wilczek Land (Земля Вильчека; Zemlya Vil'cheka), about 
 Graham Bell Island, (Остров Греэм-Белл, Ostrov Graham Bell), about 
 Alexandra Land (Земля Александры, Zemlya Aleksandry), about 
 Hall Island (Arctic) (Остров Галля, Ostrov Gallya), about 
 Salisbury Island (Остров Солсбери; Ostrov Solsberi), about 
 Kolguyev Island (о́стров Колгу́ев, Ostrov Kolguev), about 
 Novaya Zemlya (Новая Земля, Novaya Zemlya), about 
 Severny Island (остров Сeверный, Severny ostrov), about 
 Yuzhny Island ( Южный остров, Yuzhny ostrov), about 
 Vaygach Island, Вайгaч, Vaygach), about 
 Bely Island, (Остров Белый, Ostrov Beliy), about 
 Shokalsky Island, (Остров Шокальского, Ostrov Shokal'skogo), about 
 Vilkitsky Island (Kara Sea), (Остров Вильки́цкого; Ostrov Vil'kitskogo), about 
 Oleniy Island, (Остров Олений, Ostrov Oleniy), about 
 Zapovednik Islands (Острова Заповедник), about 
 Dikson - Sibiryakov Islands, (Диксон-Сибиряковский острова), about 
 The Kara Sea Islands, (Острова Карского моря), about 
 Sverdrup Island, (Остров Свердруп, Ostrov Sverdup)
 Arkticheskiy Institut Islands, (Острова Арктического института, Ostrova Arkticheskogo Instituta), about 259 km2 (100 sq mi)
 Izvestiy TSIK Islands, (Острова Известий ЦИК, Ostrova Izvetsiy TsIK), about 102 km2 (39 sq mi)
 Uedineniya Island, (Остров Уединения, Ostrov Uedineniya)
 Sergei Kirov Islands, (Острова Сергея Кирова, Ostrova Sergeya Kirova)
 Voronina Island, (Острова Воронина, Ostrova Voronina)
 Taymyr Island, (Остров Таймыр, Ostrova Taymyr)
 Kolchak Island, (Остров Колчака, Ostrov Kolchaka)
 Minina Skerries, (Шхеры Минина, Shhery Minina) and number of smaller islands.
 Nordenskiöld Archipelago (Архипелаг Норденшельда, Arkhipelag Nordenshel'da), about 
 Litke Islands (острова Литке; Ostrova Litke)
 Tsivolko Islands (острова Циволько; Ostrova Tsivolko)
 Pakhatusov Islands (острова Пахтусова; Ostrova Pakhtusova)
 Vostochnyye Islands (Восточные острова; Ostrova Vostochnyye, Eastern Islands)
 Vilkitsky Islands (острова Вилькицкого, Ostrova Vilkitskogo)
 Lafetenyye and Prolifnyye Islands (Ostrova Lafetnyye i Prolivnyye)
 Vize Island (Остров Визе, Ostrov Vize), about 
 Ushakov Island (Остров Ушакова, Ostrov Ushakova), about 
 Severnaya Zemlya (Северная Земля, Severnaja Zemlja), about 
October Revolution Island (Остров Октябрьской Революции, Ostrov Oktyabrskoy Revolyutsii), about 
 Bolshevik Island (о́стров Большеви́к, Ostrov Bolshevik), about 
 Komsomolets Island (остров Комсомолец, Ostrov Komsomolets), about 
 Pioneer Island (остров Пионeр, Ostrov Pioner), about 
 Bolshoy Begichev Island, (Большой Бегичев, Bolshoy Begichev), about 
 New Siberian Islands (Новосиби́рские острова, Novosibirskiye Ostrova), about 
 Anzhu Islands (Острова Анжу, Ostrova Anzhu), about 
 De Long Islands (Острова Де-Лонга, Ostrova De-Longa), about 
 Lyakhovsky Islands (Ляховские острова, Ostrova Lyakhovskiye), about 
 Medvezhyi Islands (Медвежьи острова, Medvezhyi ostrova), about 
 Ayon Island (Айон, Ayon), about 
 Wrangel Island (остров Врaнгеля, Ostrov Vrangelya), about 
 Big Diomede (остров Ратманова, Ostrov Ratmanova), about

References

 Islands of the Arctic, by J. A. Dowdeswell and M. J. Hambrey. , Cambridge University Press, 2002

External links
 An article about the land and the people of Arctic Russia

Islands of the Arctic Ocean
Islands of Russia